Harmandiola is a genus of flies belonging to the family Cecidomyiidae. The 14 described species are found in the Holarctic region. They induces galls on Populus, Castanea, and Carya.

Species
 Harmandiola amisae (Gagne, 1992)
 Harmandiola castaneae (Stebbins, 1910)
 Harmandiola cavernosa (Rübsaamen, 1899)
 Harmandiola globuli (Rübsaamen, 1889)
 Harmandiola helena (Felt, 1912)
 Harmandiola hudsoni (Felt, 1907)
 Harmandiola nucicola (Osten Sacken, 1878)
 Harmandiola polymorpha (Bremi, 1847)
 Harmandiola populea (Schrank, 1803)
 Harmandiola populi (Rübsaamen, 1917)
 Harmandiola pustulans (Kieffer, 1909)
 Harmandiola reginae (Felt, 1921)
 Harmandiola stebbinsae (Gagné, 1972)
 Harmandiola tremulae (Winnertz, 1853)

References

Cecidomyiidae
Gall-inducing insects
Insects described in 1997
Taxa named by Marcela Skuhravá
Cecidomyiidae genera